The 1992 LEN European Sprint Swimming Championships were the second edition of what later became the European Short Course Championships. It was held in Espoo, Finland from 21–22 December 1992, and was organised by the Ligue Européenne de Natation. Only the 50 m events and the 100 m individual medley were at stake.

Medal table

Results summary

Men's events

Women's events

References
Results on GBRSports.com

European Sprint
S
1992
S
Swimming competitions in Finland
Sport in Espoo
Sprint Swimming Championships